Steve Scott may refer to:

Steve Scott (runner) (born 1956), American male athlete and founder of speed golf
Steve Scott (computer architect)
Steve Scott (cricketer) (born 1955), New Zealand cricketer
Steve Scott (journalist) (born 1961), British journalist
Steve Scott (performer), American country/Americana musician, songwriter, singer, guitarist, producer and actor
Steve Scott (poet) (born 1951), British poet and musician
Steve Scott (producer), co-founder of adult movie production company Third World Media
Steve Scott (rugby union) (born 1974), player and coach
Steve Scott (wrestler) (born 1984), Canadian professional wrestler
Steve Scott (footballer) (born 1966), Welsh footballer

See also
Stephen Scott (disambiguation)